Albin Dannacher (1913 – 1993) was a Swiss wrestler. He competed in the men's Greco-Roman light heavyweight at the 1948 Summer Olympics.

References

External links
 

1913 deaths
1993 deaths
Swiss male sport wrestlers
Olympic wrestlers of Switzerland
Wrestlers at the 1948 Summer Olympics
Place of birth missing
20th-century Swiss people